The  series, also known as the  series, is a franchise of video games published by Sega and developed by Westone Bit Entertainment (formerly Escape). Beginning with the original Wonder Boy arcade game released in April 21, 1986, the game has spawned several sequels released for arcade, Master System, and Sega Genesis, as well as three compilation titles and three remakes by other developers. Several titles have been ported to other consoles by different publishers under different names, most notably Hudson Soft's Adventure Island adaptation of the original game. The main character "Wonder Boy" was named Book by the developer and Tom-Tom by Sega for overseas editions.

Overview
The first Wonder Boy game is a side-scrolling platformer in which the player must reach the end of the level, avoiding enemies and collecting fruit to restore a gradually reducing time meter. Originally Wonder Boy was going to have non-stop moving as a pressure element, but the designer Ryuichi Nishizawa who could not play the game like that, had that element removed. Aside from Wonder Boy III: Monster Lair, which features similar gameplay to the first Wonder Boy while also incorporating shoot 'em up portions, the other games in the series, referred to in Japan as the Monster World sub-series, focus on a fantasy setting with role-playing elements. Defeating enemies in these games earns money that can be used to purchase new weapons, armor, and items to make the player stronger. Many of these games have a Metroidvania approach to gameplay, in which obtaining new items or abilities can grant access to new areas in the game.

List of games

Main series

Remakes

Compilations
{| class="wikitable" border="1"
|-
! scope="col" | Title
! scope="col" | Release
! scope="col" | System
! scope="col" class="unsortable" | Games included
|-
| Sega Ages Vol.29: Monster World Complete Collection
| 2007 (Japan only)
| PlayStation 2
| 
Wonder Boy
Wonder Boy in Monster Land
Wonder Boy III: Monster Lair
Wonder Boy III: The Dragon's Trap
Wonder Boy in Monster World
Monster World IV
|-
| Sega Vintage Collection: Monster World
| 2012
| PlayStation 3, Xbox 360
| 
Wonder Boy in Monster Land
Wonder Boy in Monster World
Monster World IV
|-
| Sega Genesis Classics
| 2018
| PlayStation 4, Xbox One, Windows
|
Wonder Boy III: Monster Lair
Wonder Boy in Monster World
|-
| Wonder Boy Collection
| 2022
| PlayStation 4, Nintendo Switch
|
Wonder Boy
Wonder Boy in Monster Land
Wonder Boy in Monster World
Monster World IV
|-
| Wonder Boy Anniversary Collection
| 2022
| PlayStation 4, Nintendo Switch, PlayStation 5
|
Wonder Boy (Arcade, Master System, Game Gear versions)
Wonder Boy in Monster Land (Arcade, Master System versions)
Wonder Boy III: The Dragon's Trap (Master System, Game Gear versions)
Wonder Boy III: Monster Lair (Arcade, Genesis versions)
Wonder Boy in Monster World (Genesis, Master System versions)
Monster World IV
|}

 Modified ports 
Westone, the developer of the series, owned the copyrights to each game in the series, while Sega retained the "Wonder Boy" and "Monster World" trademarks. This created a situation which allowed other game companies to publish ports of the games to non-Sega platforms under license from Westone, provided that they changed the titles to remove all references to "Wonder Boy" or "Monster World".

With the exception of Monster World IV, each game in Wonder Boy series has been ported to other systems by Hudson Soft. The original game was ported to the Nintendo Entertainment System under the name Adventure Island, which eventually spawned its own franchise. Wonder Boy in Monster Land, Wonder Boy III: The Dragon's Trap, and Wonder Boy in Monster World, were all released on the TurboGrafx-16/PC Engine under the names Bikkuriman World, Dragon's Curse, and The Dynastic Hero respectively. Wonder Boy III: Monster Lair was ported to the TurboGrafx-CD with original main and boss characters, although the North American version removed the "Wonder Boy III" part in the title while the Japanese version kept it. Another port of Wonder Boy in Monster Land, titled Saiyūki World, was developed by NMK and published by Jaleco for the Nintendo Famicom in Japan, also spawning an independently created sequel, Saiyūki World 2, which was released in North America as Whomp 'Em.

In Brazil, where the Master System received much popularity, Tec Toy released adapted versions of Wonder Boy in Monster Land, Wonder Boy III: The Dragon's Trap, and Wonder Boy in Monster World under the names Mônica: No Castelo do Dragão (Monica: The Dragon's Castle), Turma da Mônica em O Resgate (Monica's Gang to the Rescue), and Turma da Mônica na Terra dos Monstros (Monica's Gang in the Land of Monsters). These games replaced the main characters with characters from Mauricio de Sousa's Monica's Gang comic book series. The latter, Turma da Mônica na Terra dos Monstros, received a re-release with SD card update compatibility in August 2017. 

 Adventure Island series

Adventure Island was Hudson Soft's adaptation of the original Wonder Boy game for the Nintendo Entertainment System and MSX2, originally released in 1986. Due to the popularity of the game's success on the system, Hudson Soft created a series of sequels with no involvement from Westone, retaining the same gameplay style as the original game.

Other media
Soundtrack

A soundtrack album, the Monster World Complete Collection Original Sound Track''' was released in 2007. Composed by Shinichi Sakamoto and Jin Watanabe the 2-CD album was published by Wave Master (the audio division of Sega).

Comic booksWonder Boy was adapted into two stories that ran in Fleetway's Sonic the Comic, which were loosely based on Wonder Boy in Monster World''. "Wonder Boy in Demon World" ran between issues 2-9 and saw Shion, the protagonist who has a dislike of being referred to as Wonder Boy, fighting to save some people while staving off a demon curse. "Wonder Boy in Ghost Land" ran between issues 22-27, and saw Shion travel to a world of ghostly dinosaurs.

References

External links
Official Monster World Complete Collection website from Sega 
 Westone Bit Entertainment (developers of the series) 

Video game franchises introduced in 1986